Camptodontus is a genus of beetles in the family Carabidae, containing the following species:

 Camptodontus amazonum Putzeys, 1866
 Camptodontus amrishi Makhan, 2010
 Camptodontus anglicanus (Stephens, 1827)
 Camptodontus cayennensis Dejean, 1826
 Camptodontus crenatus Brullė, 1837
 Camptodontus falcatus Putzeys, 1861
 Camptodontus forcipatus Putzeys, 1866
 Camptodontus interstitialis Putzeys, 1866
 Camptodontus isthmius H. W. Bates, 1881
 Camptodontus longicollis Putzeys, 1866
 Camptodontus longipennis Putzeys, 1866
 Camptodontus obliteratus Putzeys, 1866
 Camptodontus puncticeps Putzeys, 1861
 Camptodontus reichei Putzeys, 1861
 Camptodontus trisulcus Brullé, 1837

References

Scaritinae